Coralliogalathea humilis is a species of squat lobster in the family Galatheidae.

References

Further reading

 

Decapods
Articles created by Qbugbot
Crustaceans described in 1906